Maharram Akbar oglu Dadashev (15 February 1912  17 September 1944) was an Azerbaijani Red Army senior sergeant and a posthumous Hero of the Soviet Union. Dadashev was posthumously awarded the title on 24 March 1945 for his actions during the Second Jassy–Kishinev Offensive. Dadashev, a tank driver, reportedly killed eight German soldiers with his tank's machine gun. He was seriously wounded in a subsequent battle and died of his wounds in mid-September 1944.

Early life 
Dadashev was born on 15 February 1912 in Beştalı to a peasant family. He received lower secondary education and worked as a kolkhoz tractor driver.

World War II 
Dadashev was drafted into the Red Army in 1941. He fought in combat from 1942 and became a tank driver. He fought in the Battle of the Caucasus. Serving in the 233rd Tank Brigade of the 5th Mechanised Corps, he fought in the Korsun-Shevchenkovsky Offensive and Uman–Botoșani Offensive. Dadashev's unit was equipped with the American M4A2 Sherman tank. He joined the Communist Party of the Soviet Union in 1944. In August and September, Dadashev fought in the Second Jassy–Kishinev Offensive.

On 20 August, near Vaslui, Dadashev's tank attacked German positions. The tank's fire reportedly destroyed 6 anti-tank guns and 16 machine gun and mortar emplacements, killing their crews. Dadashev was wounded, but continued to drive. After running out of shells, the tank crew reportedly took shelter around the tank. Dadashev used the machine gun to reportedly kill eight German soldiers. These actions were reported to have caused a German retreat. Dadashev was seriously wounded in his left shoulder on 14 September and died of gas gangrene at the 576th Field Surgical Hospital on 17 September 1944. He was buried in Stremț. On 24 March 1945, he was posthumously awarded the title Hero of the Soviet Union and the Order of Lenin.

Legacy 
A bust of Dadashev was built in Salyan. A secondary school in Kür Qaraqaşlı was named for Dadashev.

References 

1912 births
1944 deaths
Soviet military personnel killed in World War II
Heroes of the Soviet Union
Recipients of the Order of Lenin
Soviet military personnel of World War II from Azerbaijan
Communist Party of the Soviet Union members
People from Salyan District (Azerbaijan)
Deaths from gangrene